Wolfgang Lesser (31 May 1923 – 27 September 1999) was a German composer and music official of the DDR.

Life and career 
Born in Breslau, Lesser, son of a merchant, attended the Realgymnasium in Berlin and then completed an apprenticeship as a metalworker. In 1938 he began studying music at the former Stern Conservatory in Berlin. Already in 1939 he emigrated as a Jew to London and worked in England as a varnisher and farmhand. The following year he was interned as Enemy alien on the Isle of Man. In 1942, he became a member of the Freie Deutsche Jugend and the Communist Party of Germany. Between 1943 and 1947, he was a member of the British Army.

In 1947 he returned to Berlin, became a member of the SED and worked for the FDJ in various functions. In 1949 he attended the state party school of the SED. In 1951 he became a member of the Cultural Association of the GDR. From 1950 to 1954, Lesser studied at the Hochschule für Musik "Hanns Eisler" with Rudolf Wagner-Régeny, Hanns Eisler and Günter Kochan. From 1954 to 1961, he worked as a composer and teacher for the State Folk Art Ensemble of the GDR. Since 1961, he has been a freelance musician.

Since 1971, he was a member of the cultural commission of the Politbüro des ZK der SED and a member of the Volkskammer (until 1989), where he was a member of the Committee on National Education. From 1985 to 1989, he was President of the Association of Composers and Musicologists.

In particular, Lesser composed political songs and chansons, but also stage music (e.g. for Friedrich Wolf's Thomas Müntzer) and film music (e.g. for the DEFA films Die Schönste in 1957, Beschreibung eines Sommers in 1962 and König Drosselbart in 1965) as well as the school opera Oktoberkinder. (1970).

Lesser died in Berlin at the age of 76.

Work 
 Liederzyklus (1957)
 Violinkonzert (1962)
 Sonate für Solovioline (1963)
 Das Jahr. Zyklus für Kinderchor und Instrumente (1963, text: Jens Gerlach).
 Wir – die Partei (1971, text: Jens Gerlach)

Stage music
 for Friedrich Wolf's Thomas Müntzer
 for Ben Jonson's Volpone
 for George Farquhars Glückritter

Film music
1957: Die Schönste
1959: Claudia
1960: Der neue Fimmel
1961: Drei Kapitel Glück
1961: Steinzeitballade
1962: Entdeckung des Julian Böll
1962: Peter und das Einmaleins mit der Sieben
1962: Freispruch mangels Beweises
1962: Das Stacheltier – Die Moritat vom Durst
1963: Beschreibung eines Sommers
1964: Deutschland – Endstation Ost
1964: Als Martin vierzehn war
1965: König Drosselbart
1966: Lebende Ware

Awards 
 Vaterländischer Verdienstorden in Bronze (1964), Silver (1973) and Gold (1978)
 Ehrenspange zum Vaterländischen Verdienstorden in Gold (1983)
 Kunstpreis der DDR (1968)
 Nationalpreis der DDR (1969)
 Stern der Völkerfreundschaft in Gold (1988)

Honours 
In Stralsund (Ossenreyerstraße) a Stolperstein in front of the house number 21/22 commemorates Wolfgang Lesser.

Further reading 
 Gabriele Baumgartner, Dieter Hebig (ed.): Biographisches Handbuch der SBZ/DDR. 1945–1990. Vol. 1: Abendroth – Lyr. K. G. Saur Verlag, Munich 1996, .
 Torsten Musial: Lesser, Wolfgang. In  5th edition. Vol 1. Ch. Links, Berlin 2010, .
 Alfred Fleischhacker (ed): Das war unser Leben, Erinnerungen und Dokumente zur Geschichte der FDJ in Großbritannien 1939–1946. Verlag Neues Leben, Berlin 1996, .

References

External links 
 
 
 

20th-century classical composers
German film score composers
German composers
Members of the Volkskammer
Jewish emigrants from Nazi Germany to the United Kingdom
Communist Party of Germany members
Socialist Unity Party of Germany members
Recipients of the Patriotic Order of Merit (honor clasp)
1923 births
1999 deaths
Musicians from Wrocław
People interned in the Isle of Man during World War II
20th-century German musicologists